Brennen is a given name and surname. Notable people with the name include:

Brennen Beyer, (born 1992), American football player
Brennen Carvalho (born 1985), American football player
Brennen Jones (born 1987),  Canadian curler
David A. Brennen, American jurist and academic administrator
Edward Brennen, British philanthropist who lived and died in India.

See also
Brenen, surname
Brennan (given name)
Brennan (surname)